Vignal is a surname. Notable people with the surname include:

Grégory Vignal (born 1981), French footballer
Marc Vignal (born 1933), French musicologist, writer, and radio producer
Pierre Vignal (1855–1925), French painter
René Vignal (1926–2016), French footballer

See also
Vignale (disambiguation)